Almost Acoustic is a live album by the Jerry Garcia Acoustic Band.  Held in high esteem by fans for superb sound quality and fine musical selection, it contains songs that were recorded from late November to early December 1987 at the Warfield Theatre in San Francisco and the Wiltern Theatre in Los Angeles.  It was released on December 6, 1988.

The Jerry Garcia Acoustic Band was a short-lived musical ensemble that played folk and bluegrass music, using acoustic instruments.  The members of the band were Jerry Garcia on guitar and vocals, David Nelson on guitar and vocals, Sandy Rothman on mandolin, dobro, and vocals, John Kahn on double bass, Kenny Kosek on fiddle, and, on some songs, David Kemper on snare drum.

A second album by the Jerry Garcia Acoustic Band, also recorded live in 1987, is Ragged but Right, which was released in 2010.  Additionally, three live albums from the 1987 Lunt-Fontanne shows that were released in some years later include music by the Jerry Garcia Acoustic Band as well as the Jerry Garcia Band — Pure Jerry: Lunt-Fontanne, New York City, October 31, 1987, Pure Jerry: Lunt-Fontanne, New York City, The Best of the Rest, October 15–30, 1987, and On Broadway: Act One – October 28th, 1987.

Track listing

Personnel

Jerry Garcia Acoustic Band
Jerry Garcia – guitar, vocals
David Nelson – guitar, vocals
Sandy Rothman – mandolin, Dobro, vocals
John Kahn – acoustic bass
Kenny Kosek – fiddle
David Kemper – snare drum

Production
Producer – Sandy Rothman
Live stereo recording – John Cutler
Digital editing – Sonic Solutions
Digital mastering – Joe Gastwirt
Cover art – John Kahn
Photography – Ken Friedman

References

Jerry Garcia Acoustic Band live albums
1988 live albums
Arista Records live albums
Grateful Dead Records live albums